Vicki J. Huddleston (born 1942)  is a retired U.S. diplomat who served as Ambassador to Mali, and U.S. Ambassador to Madagascar.

Career
Ambassador Huddleston is a retired career Senior Foreign Service Officer whose last assignment was as U.S. Deputy Assistant Secretary of Defense for African Affairs in the Office of the Secretary of Defense from June 2009 through December 2011.  Before that she was Chargé d'Affaires ad interim to Ethiopia, United States Ambassador to Mali, Principal Officer of the U.S. Interests Section in Havana, Deputy Assistant Secretary of State for African Affairs, and U.S. Ambassador to Madagascar. 
She was Chief of United States Interests Section in Havana from 1999–2002 and was earlier the Deputy and then the Coordinator of the Office of Cuban Affairs. Prior to joining the Department of Defense, she was a visiting scholar at Brookings Institution. She was Chief of Party for a USAID-funded capacity building project in Haiti from 2013-2015.

Ambassador Huddleston was a Fellow at the Institute of Politics of the Harvard Kennedy School of Government and an American Political Science Association Congressional Fellow on the staff of Senator Jeff Bingaman (D-NM). She began her overseas career as a Peace Corps volunteer in Peru. She also worked for the American Institute for Free Labor Development (AIFLD) in Peru and Brazil. Additional assignments as a career Foreign Service Officer include economic and consular officer in  Sierra Leone, economic officer in Mali, Office of Mexican Affairs, and the Bureau of International Organization Affairs. Huddleston earned a master's degree from the Johns Hopkins School of Advanced International Studies and a BA from the University of Colorado. She has received U.S. Department of State awards, including a Distinguished Honor Award and a Presidential Meritorious Service Award. In 2008, she was a member of the Obama-Biden Transition Team for the U.S. Department of State. She is the co-author of "Learning to Salsa: New Steps in U.S.-Cuba Relations," and opinion pieces in The New York Times, The Miami Herald, and The Washington Post. She is a former commentator for NBC-Universal. She currently speaks and provides commentary on Cuba and Africa.

Huddleston is currently a Consultant to the Transnational Strategy Group, within their Cuba Business Advisory Practice Group.

Personal life

Ambassador Huddleston lives in Santa Fe, New Mexico, and is married to a retired US Foreign Service officer; they have two children, Robert and Alexandra.

Works 
Learning to salsa : new steps in U.S.-Cuba relations, Washington, D.C. : Brookings Institution Press, 2010. , 
 Our Woman in Havana: a diplomat's chronicle of America's long struggle with Castro's Cuba. Woodstock: Overlook, 2018. ,

References

External links

U. S. Department of Defense: Biography of Vicki J. Huddleston

1942 births
Living people
University of Colorado alumni
Paul H. Nitze School of Advanced International Studies alumni
Ambassadors of the United States to the Comoros
Ambassadors of the United States to Madagascar
Ambassadors of the United States to Mali
United States Foreign Service personnel
Peace Corps volunteers
American women ambassadors
20th-century American diplomats
21st-century American diplomats
20th-century American women
21st-century American women